Charles Alphonsus Sherrard (1924-1993) was an Irish-Australian tenor singer better known by the stage name Patrick O'Hagan. Born in Derry, Northern Ireland, he immigrated to Australia where he found success singing traditional Irish and Celtic songs. He moved back to Ireland, settling in Drogheda in County Louth, where he ran a pub before he decided to return to Australia. In the late 1950s and early 1960s, he starred in the Australian television series Patrick O'Hagan Sings. His artistic career spanned two decades in the 1950s and 1960s with a comeback in the mid-1970s.

Personal life
He was married to Ellen Sherrard. They had four children, sons Michael, Eamon and Sean and daughter Fiona. Patrick O'Hagan died in Queensland, Australia. His wife Ellen died in 2012. His son Seán Patrick Michael Sherrard better known as Johnny Logan is a famous Australian-born Irish singer and composer and winner of the Eurovision Song Contest twice with "What's Another Year" in 1980 and "Hold Me Now" in 1987. Johnny Logan said about his father had been his inspiration. "I wanted to be just like him and for him to be proud of me, as I was of him," he said. The two toured together in Australia and New Zealand.

Discography

Albums
1954: Irish Ballads (2 albums)
1957: Songs We Sing
1957: Irish Ballads 
1957: Concert Tour
1958: Encores
1960: Presenting
1963: Scottish Airs
1974: The Heart & Soul of Ireland
1977: 22 Golden Shamrocks

Joint albums
1962: New Sounds in Irish Music (with Teresa Duffy)

References

External links
Discogs - Patrick O'Hagan page

1924 births
1993 deaths
Musicians from Derry (city)
Northern Ireland emigrants to Australia
20th-century male singers from Northern Ireland
20th-century Australian male singers